Mandeep Jangra (born 19 May 1993) is an Indian amateur boxer. He won the silver medal at the 2013 Asian Amateur Boxing Championships in the welterweight category. He represented India at the 2014 Commonwealth Games in Glasgow in the same category and won the silver medal. He was awarded the prestigious Arjuna Award in 2015.

Jangra is coached by Indian boxer Akhil Kumar and supported by Anglian Medal Hunt Company.

Mandeep Jangra has achieved a few major achievements other than Arjuna Award & Silver at the Glasgow Commonwealth games. It includes a silver medal at the Senior Asian Boxing Championship 2013 and a gold medal at the South Asian Games 2016.

References

1993 births
Living people
Indian male boxers
Boxers at the 2014 Commonwealth Games
Boxers from Haryana
Welterweight boxers
Commonwealth Games silver medallists for India
Boxers at the 2014 Asian Games
Commonwealth Games medallists in boxing
Asian Games competitors for India
Recipients of the Arjuna Award
Medallists at the 2014 Commonwealth Games